The Malda Town–Patna Express is an Express train belonging to Eastern Railway zone that runs between  and  in India. It is currently being operated with 13415/13416 train numbers on tri-weekly basis.

Service

The 13415/Malda Town–Patna Express has an average speed of 45 km/hr and covers 403 km in 9h. The 13416/Patna–Malda Town Express Express has an average speed of 38 km/hr and covers 403 km in 10h 35m.

Route and halts 

The important halts of the train are:

Coach composition

The train has standard ICF (utkristh) rakes with max speed of 110 kmph. The train consists of 18 coaches:

 1 AC II Tier
 1 AC III Tier
 8 Sleeper coaches
 6 General
 2 Seating cum Luggage Rake

Traction

Both trains are hauled by a WAP-4 electric locomotive from Malda Town to Patna Junction and vice versa.

See also 

 Malda Town railway station
 Patna Junction railway station
 Sealdah–Varanasi Express
 Sealdah–Anand Vihar Express

Notes

External links 

 13415/Malda Town-Patna Express
 13416/Patna-Malda Town Express

References 

Transport in Patna
Transport in Maldah
Express trains in India
Rail transport in Jharkhand
Rail transport in Bihar
Rail transport in West Bengal